is a railway station in the Iiyama Line, East Japan Railway Company (JR East), in Hokushin in the village of Sakae, Shimominochi District, Nagano Prefecture, Japan.

Lines
Yokokura Station is served by the Iiyama Line, and is 46.6 kilometers from the starting point of the line at Toyono Station.

Station layout
The station consists of one side platform serving a single bi-directional track. The station originally had an island platform, but was converted when rebuilt following the 2011 Nagano Earthquake. The station is staffed.

History
Yokokura Station opened on 19 November 1925. A new station building was completed in April 2004. With the privatization of Japanese National Railways (JNR) on 1 April 1987, the station came under the control of JR East.

Passenger statistics
In fiscal 2017, the station was used by an average of 15 passengers daily (boarding passengers only).

Surrounding area
Chikuma River
 Sakae Elementary School

See also
 List of railway stations in Japan

References

External links

 JR East station information 

Railway stations in Nagano Prefecture
Iiyama Line
Railway stations in Japan opened in 1925
Sakae, Nagano